Association Sportive Monts is a French association football club founded in 1924. They are based in the town of Monts, Indre-et-Loire and their home stadium is the des Griffonnes. As of the 2009–10 season, the club plays in the Promotion d'Honneur de Centre, the eighth tier of French football.

External links
AS Monts official website 

Football clubs in France
Association football clubs established in 1924
1924 establishments in France
Sport in Indre-et-Loire
Football clubs in Centre-Val de Loire